Deroceras laeve, the marsh slug, is a species of small air-breathing land slug, a terrestrial pulmonate gastropod mollusk in the family Agriolimacidae.

Distribution
The distribution of Deroceras laeve was originally Palearctic, from the subpolar zones to the southern margins. Today this slug species has been introduced worldwide except Antarctica, also on tropical islands such as New Guinea and on Pacific islands.

Europe:
 British Isles: Great Britain and Ireland. The species has shown little evidence for significant decline in Britain.
 Czech Republic - least concern (LC)
 Netherlands
 Poland
 Slovakia
 Ukraine
 Sweden
 Switzerland - lower concern in Switzerland
 and others

Asia:
 Pakistan
 China
 Taiwan

The Americas:
 California
Costa Rica 
 El Hatillo Municipality, Miranda, Venezuela
 Colombia
 introduced to Dominica (first report in 2009)
 introduced to Brazil
 
 and others

Description
The slug is from brown to dark brown, usually with dark and characteristic but not well visible spots arranged in groups. The shape is almost cylindrical, posterior end is abruptly widened. The mantle covers 50% of body length (unusually large). There are wrinkles on skin present (may disappear in preserved slugs). Mucus is thin, colourless.

This slug is 15–25 mm long when preserved.

The populations of this species that occur in Central Europe are much darker than other Deroceras species in that area.

Reproductive system: Penis is often reduced, elongated if present, without proper penial gland but with two or more tiny glandular papillae and its end. Retractor is unforked and attached at half penis length, stimulator small, cone-shaped but looks more like a papilla. Tubular oviductus and atrium are unusually long. There is no rectal caecum.

Ecology

Habitat 
Deroceras laeve has high ecological tolerance, but needs permanently wet habitats. It is usually found in lowlands and very humid habitats, swamps, riversides, wetlands, especially alder and oak woods, marshlands and degraded areas, also greenhouses, often near water under wood or detritus. It tolerates subpolar and tropical temperatures. Newly created habitats are often colonized after a few years. In Switzerland in up to 1800 m altitude, but usually below 1000 m, in Bulgaria in up to 2500 m.

Deroceras laeve can be a serious pest in greenhouses. On the other hand, the species is threatened by continuous elimination of wet habitats by drainage, construction projects and road construction.

It is the only land gastropod that goes deliberately into the water and can survive for days submerged. Because of this unusual behavior, the species can be dispersed by flowing water.

Feeding habits 
Deroceras laeve is omnivorous and capable of eating eggs and small insects, but tends to prefer plant matter, either alive or dead.

Life cycle 
The eggs of this species can also survive when submerged; juveniles can hatch underwater and then climb to the surface.

The life cycle is extremely short, and can take place within less than a month. This species can have up to 5 generations in a year, with several generations alive at the same time. Frequently there are forms with a reduced penis, which reproduce by self-fertilisation. The maximum age of this slug is not more than 1 year.

Parasites 
Parasites of Deroceras laeve include:
 Parelaphostrongylus tenuis

References 
This article incorporates public domain text from the reference 

 Spencer, H.G., Marshall, B.A. & Willan, R.C. (2009). Checklist of New Zealand living Mollusca. pp 196–219 in Gordon, D.P. (ed.) New Zealand inventory of biodiversity. Volume one. Kingdom Animalia: Radiata, Lophotrochozoa, Deuterostomia. Canterbury University Press, Christchurch

External links 

Deroceras laeve at Animalbase taxonomy,short description, distribution, biology,status (threats), images 
  Deroceras laeve  images at Encyclopedia of Life  
Fauna Europaea Search Distribution 
  Deroceras laeve on the UF / IFAS Featured Creatures Web site

Agriolimacidae
Palearctic molluscs
Gastropods of Europe
Gastropods described in 1774
Taxa named by Otto Friedrich Müller
Molluscs of Pakistan